Ananda may refer to:

Hinduism
Ānanda (Hindu philosophy)
Anandamaya kosha
Ananda Tandava, a sacred dance of Hindu mythology

People

Ananda, disciple of the Buddha
Ananda (King of Anxi), member of Genghis Khan's family
Ananda Coomaraswamy (1877-1947), Ceylonese metaphysician and art historian
Ananda Everingham (born 1982), Thai actor and model
Ananda Jacobs (born 1983), American actress, singer, model, producer, and composer
Ananda Lewis (born 1973), American television personality
Ananda Mahidol (1935-1946), the eighth king of Siam from the Chakri dynasty
Ananda Marchildon (born 1986), Canadian-Dutch model
Ananda Mikola (born 1980), Indonesian racecar driver
Ananda Shankar (1942-1999), Indian musician

Places
Ananda, Ivory Coast, a town, commune, and sub-prefecture in Ivory Coast
Ananda College, a school in Sri Lanka
Ananda Church of Self-Realization
Ananda Temple, a Buddhist temple in Myanmar

Arts and media
Ananda (album), a 2006 album by Paulina Rubio
Ananda Marga, international spiritual and social movement started in India
Ananda Tandavam (film), a 2008 Tamil film

See also
Ananta (disambiguation)
Sananda (disambiguation)